Joseph S. Hunter House is a historic house in Cedar City, Utah, United States. Listed on the National Register of Historic Places in 1982, it was delisted in 2007 after being moved to the Frontier Homestead State Park Museum.

See also

 National Register of Historic Places listings in Iron County, Utah

References

External links
 https://web.archive.org/web/20160212193614/http://craigkittermanarchitects.com/historic.php

Buildings and structures in Cedar City, Utah
Houses completed in 1866
1866 establishments in Utah Territory
National Register of Historic Places in Iron County, Utah
Houses on the National Register of Historic Places in Utah